The Garmin Titan Desert is a six-day multiple stage mountain bike race held annually in Morocco since 2006 through the Moroccan desert between the Atlas Mountains and Sahara Desert. The competition was founded by Jaime Alguersuari Sr.'s RPM-MKTG, and in 2017 Amaury Sport Organisation joined as partner.

Editions

2018 
The thirteenth edition took place from April 29 to May 4, 2018. A route of 620 kilometers and 7,500 meters divided into 6 stages, starting in Boumalne Dades in a first stage in a loop, to finish the adventure in Maadid. An edition that broke numerous records: record of participants, with 612 bikers; record of finishers, with a total of 546 at the finish line; record of female participation, with 70 women in the adventure; and with more than 15% of foreign bikers from 24 countries. Josep Betalú, cyclist of the Doctore Bike Team - BMC got his third consecutive win. Second was Ramón Sagués and Robert Bou was classified in third position. In women's category, Ramona Gabriel won dominating all her rivals since the first day. Anna Ramírez, the current winner, finished second and the podium was completed by Veerle Cleiren.

2019 
The Garmin Titan Desert 2019 will take place from April 28 to May 3, 2019, in Morocco.

References

External links 
 

Cycle races in Morocco
Mountain biking events
Ultra-distance cycling
2006 establishments in Morocco